Cilla is an English female given name, originally the diminutive form of Priscilla and less frequently Drusilla.  It first appeared in the 20th century.

People named Cilla include:

People
Cilla Black (1943–2015), English singer, actress and entertainer
Cilla Fisher (born 1952), ex-member of the folk music group The Singing Kettle
Cilla McQueen (born 1949), poet
Cilla Naumann (born 1960), Swedish author and journalist
Cilla Snowball, British businessperson in advertising

Fictional characters
Cilla Battersby-Brown, a character in the British soap opera Coronation Street

In Greek mythology, it refers to:
Cilla (mythology), two women associated with ancient Troy

Feminine given names